Burkina Faso–China relations refers to the foreign relations between Burkina Faso and China. Burkina Faso has an embassy in Beijing and China has an embassy in Ouagadougou.

History
From 1961 until 1973, Burkina Faso recognized the Republic of China as the sole legitimate representative in China. 

From September 15, 1973, to February 4, 1994, Ouagadougou and its five successive presidents maintained a modest relationship with Beijing (in terms of projects and financing). Opportunistic, this recognition came two years after the accession of so-called mainland China to the UN Security Council. In 1971, Burkina Faso (then still "Upper Volta") opposed with the United States to the Resolution 2758 of the United Nations General Assembly of October 25, 1971. Maurice Yaméogo (president from 1959 to 1966) had however, maintained relations with Beijing before the formalization of bilateral relations, that is to say during the Taiwanese-Burkinabe cooperation. But Burkina Faso is the only African state to have twice recognized the Republic of China: in 1964 and in 1994. 

At the beginning of 1994, Ouagadougou faced numerous fiscal and economic difficulties - including the Structural Adjustment Program (SAP) implemented since March 1991 or the devaluation of the CFA franc. Burkina Faso is desperate for foreign financing, preferably non-Western. In any case, China does not seem willing to offer it, although Compaore was the first African leader to visit China after Tiananmen.  The envisaged impacts of the currency depreciation and the general economic situation of the country incite the Burkinabè head of State to choose the only partner able to finance quickly and unconditionally - except his recognition - his future "national commitments": Taiwan. This opportunity, to which is added a certain number of interests of which at least one would be personal, also presents the advantage of seeing a "new" actor contributing, indirectly at least, to the second part of the first. official mandate (1991-1998). 

As a result, Taiwan helped finance the political program of the former Burkinabe leader who received between 40 and 50 million dollars from Taiwan to recognize the Republic of China to the detriment of the People's Republic of China.

On 24 May 2018, Burkina Faso again cut ties with the Republic of China and two days later, on 26 May, Burkina Faso re-established diplomatic relations with the People's Republic of China.

See also

 Dates of establishment of diplomatic relations with the People's Republic of China
 Burkina Faso–Taiwan relations
 Foreign relations of Burkina Faso
 Foreign relations of China

References

 
China
Burkina Faso